Amber Dermont is an American author. She has a bachelor's degree from Vassar College, an MFA in fiction from the Iowa Writers' Workshop and a Ph.D. in Creative Writing and Literature from the University of Houston, and she is a faculty member at Rice University.

Books
Dermont is the author of two books: The Starboard Sea, a novel, and Damage Control, a story collection.

The Starboard Sea is a novel about a boy who transfers to a new prep school after a tragedy involving his sailing partner. The book was a New York Times best seller and was named one of The New York Times' 100 Notable Books of 2012. It was also a finalist for the 2014 Townsend Prize for Fiction.

References

American women novelists
Living people
Vassar College alumni
Iowa Writers' Workshop alumni
University of Houston alumni
Rice University faculty
American women short story writers
21st-century American novelists
21st-century American women writers
21st-century American short story writers
Novelists from Texas
Year of birth missing (living people)
American women academics